A moat is a type of fortification.

Moat or Moats may also refer to:

Places
 Moat, Cumbria, a location in England

Municipalities
 Moats, Ohio, an unincorporated community in the US
 New Moat, a village and community in Wales
 Old Moat, an electoral district or ward in Manchester, England

Structures
 Moat House, Sutton Coldfield, a building in West Midlands, England
 Moat House, Tamworth, a building in Staffordshire, England

People
 Moat (surname)
 Arthur Moats (born 1988), American football player
 Ryan Moats (born 1982), American former football player

Enterprises and organizations
 Moat, an enterprise software company measuring digital media and marketing acquired by Oracle Corporation
 Moat Community College, a school in Leicester, England
 Moat Theatre, a theatre and arts centre in Ireland

Other uses
 Economic moat, a term coined by Warren Buffett, to describe a sustainable competitive advantage
 Moat, a clear ring outside the eyewall of a tropical cyclone
 Gaussian moat problem, an unsolved problem in mathematics

See also
 Mote (disambiguation)
 Motte (disambiguation)